Yevgeny Bezruchenko (born October 26, 1977) is a long distance swimmer from Russia.

Exyernal links
 
 

1977 births
Living people
Male long-distance swimmers
Russian male swimmers
World Aquatics Championships medalists in open water swimming
20th-century Russian people
21st-century Russian people